Liselotte Mettler is an Austrian-German surgeon who specializes in endocrinology, reproductive medicine, gynecological endoscopy and gynecological oncology. Mettler is a professor emeritus for the Department of Gynecology and Obstetrics at Kiel University, Germany where she worked closely with Kurt Semm. The author of more than 600 publications and several books.

Selected bibliography 
 Mettler, Liselotte; Patvegar, M; et al., "Value of malignancy exclusion of ovarian cysts prior to laparoscopy", J Reproduktionsmed Endokrinol 5 (2008), Nr. 2, S. 93-100
 Mettler, Liselotte; Schollmeyer, Thoralf et al., "Robotic assistance in gynecological oncology.", Current Opinion in Oncology 20 (2008), Nr. 5, S. 581-9
 Soyinka, A S, Mettler, Liselotte, et al., "Enhancing Laparoscopic Performance with the LTS3E: A Computerized Hybrid Physical Reality Simulator", Fertil Steril 90 (2008), Nr. 5, S. 1988-94
 Summa, Birte, Mettler, Liselotte, et al., "Early detection of a twin tubal pregnancy by Doppler sonography allows fertility-conserving laparoscopic surgery.", ''Arch Gynecology Obstetrics May (2008), Nr. 1, S. 1
 Mettler, L. et al. The past, present and future of minimally invasive endoscopyin gynecology: A review and speculative outlook. Minimally Invasive Therapy: 2013;22:210-226

References

External links 
 Liselotte Mettler, MD - Germany, Executive Advisory Board at OBGYN.net
 Liselotte Mettler, MD - Germany, editorial advisor st Endometriosis Zone

Women gynaecologists
Living people
Academic staff of the University of Kiel
Year of birth missing (living people)
Place of birth missing (living people)